Owen Lord was Archdeacon of Barnstaple from 1477 to 1478.

References

Archdeacons of Barnstaple
15th-century English clergy